WireframeSketcher is a wireframing tool developed by Peter Severin and first released in November 2008. WireframeSketcher software is a member of Eclipse Foundation. It is used for creating wireframes, mockups and prototypes for desktop, web and mobile applications. It allows the designer to create screens by arranging pre-built widgets using a drag-and-drop WYSIWYG editor and then organize screens into interactive storyboards. The application is offered in a desktop version as well as a plug-in for any Eclipse IDE such as Flash Builder, ColdFusion Builder, Aptana, MyEclipse and Zend Studio. WireframeSketcher is a general purpose tool, but it also provides specialized widget libraries for Android, iOS and Windows Phone.

Awards
 WireframeSketcher was a finalist in the Best RCP Application category at EclipseCon 2011.
 WireframeSketcher was a finalist in the Best Developer Tool category at EclipseCon 2013.

See also 
 Website wireframe
 Mockup
 Prototyping
 Rapid prototyping
 Rapid Application Development
 Software Prototyping

References

External links
WireframeSketcher Website

2008 software